Go, GO, G.O., or Go! may refer to:

Arts and entertainment

Games and sport
 Go (game), a board game for two players
 Travel Go (formerly Go – The International Travel Game), a game based on world travel
 Go, the starting position located at the corner of the board in the board game Monopoly
 Go, a 1992 game for the Philips CD-i video game system
 Go, a large straw battering ram used in the Korean sport of Gossaum
 Go!, a label under which U.S. Gold published ZX Spectrum games
 Go route, a pattern run in American football
 Go series, a turn-based, puzzle video game series by Square Enix, based on various Square Enix franchises
 Counter-Strike: Global Offensive (CS:GO), a first-person shooter developed by Valve
 Pokémon Go, an augmented reality game

Film
 Go (1999 film), American film
 Go (2001 film), a Japanese film
 Go (2007 film), a Bollywood film
 Go Karts (film), an Australian film also titled as Go!

Literature
 Go (Holmes novel), a novel by John Clellon Holmes
 Go (Kaneshiro novel), a novel by Kazuki Kaneshiro
 Go, a novel by Simon Lewis

Media
 GO (American magazine), a free lesbian magazine
 Go! (South African magazine), an English-language version of the Afrikaans travel magazine Weg!
 Go!, Computer and Video Gamess handheld console gaming magazine 
 Go (radio), a Canadian radio program
 Go.com, a web portal created and operated by Disney
 G/O Media, runs Gizmodo, Kotaku, Deadspin and other sites.

Music
 Go (drum), hanja term to refer to Korean drum, buk
 Go Records, an Australian recording company
 Go! Discs, a UK record label with a subsidiary Go! Beat Records

Albums
 Go (Bedük album)
 Go! (Cartman album), and the title song
 Go (Dexter Gordon album)
 Go (Doc Walker album), and the title song
 Go! (Fair Warning album)
 Go (Girugamesh album)
 Go (Go album), by the 1970s supergroup
 Go (H2O album), and the title song (see below)
 Go (Jónsi album)
 Go (Kreva album)
 Go! (Letters to Cleo album), and the title song
 Go (Mario album), and the title song
 Go (Motion City Soundtrack album)
 Go (Newsboys album), and the title song
 Go (Newsboys EP)
 Go (Pat Benatar album), and the title song
 Go (Paul Chambers album)
 Go (Sarah Bettens album), and the title song
 Go (Vertical Horizon album)
 Go – The Very Best of Moby, and the title song (see below)
 The Go (The Go album)
 The Go (Skunkhour album)
 Go, an album by Hiroshima

Performers
 Go (band), a 1970s supergroup
 G.O (singer), a member of South Korean group MBLAQ
 The Go, a Detroit garage rock band

Songs
 "Go" (Asia song)
 "Go" (The Chemical Brothers song)
 "Go!" (Common song)
 "Go" (Delilah song)
 "Go" (Flow song)
 "Go" (Hanson song)
 "Go!" (Joe Inoue song)
 "Go!" (Jupiter Rising song)
 "Go" (McClain Sisters song)
 "Go" (Moby song)
 "Go" (Pearl Jam song)
 "Go" (Scott Fitzgerald song)
 "Go" (The Kid Laroi and Juice Wrld song)
 "Go!" (Tones on Tail song)
 "Go", by Andy Hunter from Exodus
 "Go", by The Apples in Stereo from The Discovery of a World Inside the Moone
 "Go", by The Black Keys from Let's Rock
 "Go", by Blink-182 from Blink-182
 "Go", by Boys Like Girls from Love Drunk
 "Go", by Daniel Johnston from Respect
 "Go", by Def Leppard from Songs from the Sparkle Lounge
 "Go!", by DM Ashura
 "Go", by Earshot from The Silver Lining
 "Go", by Grimes featuring Blood Diamonds
 "Go", by H2O from Thicker than Water
 "Go", by Indigo Girls from Come On Now Social
 "Go", by The Innocence Mission from Glow
 "Go", by Jamelia from Walk with Me
 "Go", by Kelly Clarkson
 "Go!", by M83 from Junk
 "Go!", by Marillion from Marillion.com
 "Go!", by Melanie Chisholm from Northern Star
 "Go" , by Meg Myers from Make a Shadow
 "Go!", by Public Service Broadcasting from The Race for Space
 "Go", by The Replacements from Stink
 "Go!", by Santigold featuring Karen O from Master of My Make-Believe
 "Go", by The Smashing Pumpkins from Machina II/The Friends & Enemies of Modern Music
 "Go", by Steriogram from Schmack!
 "Go", by Tages from Tages 2
 "Go", by Thousand Foot Krutch from The Art of Breaking
 "Go", by Triple C's from Custom Cars & Cycles
 "Go", by Valley Lodge from Use Your Weapons, used as the theme song for Last Week Tonight with John Oliver
 "Go", by The Vandals from Look What I Almost Stepped In...
 "Go!", by will.i.am from Must B 21
 "Go", by Zebrahead from Playmate of the Year
 "Go Go Go", by Chuck Berry, B-side of the single "Come On"

Television
 Go (South African TV channel), a defunct South African channel
 9Go!, an Australian channel formerly named "GO!"
 PBS Kids Go!, a former PBS kids block for older kids 
 Go (1973 TV series), an American children's series
 Go (game show), a 1980s American game show
 Gō (TV series), an NHK Taiga drama planned for 2011
 The Go!! Show, also termed Go!!, a 1960s Australian music show
 "Go" (Prison Break), an episode of the television series Prison Break
 "Go!", an episode of Teen Titans

Other media
 Gō (art-name), a pseudonym used by Japanese artists

Companies

Transportation

Airlines
 Go (airline), a former British airline, now a part of easyJet
 Go! (airline), a Hawaiian airline operated by Mesa Air Group
 Go! Mokulele, a Hawaiian airline operated as a joint venture of Mesa Air Group and Republic Airways Holdings
 Go First, an airline in India

Road and rail
 Go! Cooperative, a community-based co-operative train operating company in the UK
 Go-Ahead Group, a UK rail and bus operating company
 Go North East, a bus unit of Go-Ahead Group
 GoRail, a passenger rail operator in Estonia
 GO Transit, a regional public transit system in Ontario, Canada
 GoTransit (North Carolina), a branding of transit services in the Triangle region of North Carolina
 GO Transit (Wisconsin), the public transit system in Winnebago County, Wisconsin

Other companies
 GO (Malta), a telecommunications company in Malta
 GO Corp., a pen-based computing company
 Etihad Atheeb Telecom, a telecommunications company in Saudi Arabia that trades as "GO"
 Global Oncology, an American healthcare organization

Language
 Go (verb), an English verb meaning to move from one place to another
 go, in Esperanto orthography, a name for the letter g

People
 Gō (given name), a masculine Japanese given name
 Go (Korean name), or Ko, a Korean family name
 Go of Balhae, Korean general and ruler of the 8th century

Places
 Glorioso Islands (FIPS 10-4 territory code), in the Indian Ocean, administered by France
 Goiás (GO), a state of Brazil

Science and technology

Computing
 AlphaGo, a computer program that plays the board game Go, developed by DeepMind Technologies while it was a subsidiary of Google
 Android Go, a stripped-down version of Google's Android operating system designed for low-end smartphones
 Gigaoctet (Go), a unit of information or computer storage
 Go (programming language), also known as Golang, a programming language designed at Google
 Go! (programming language), created by Francis McCabe in 2003
 Go continuous delivery, a software tool for continuous delivery of software
 Google Go, a mobile app designed to enable use of the Google Search search engine for lower-spec devices and those with slower connections

Other uses in science and technology
 Gō (unit), a traditional Japanese unit of area and volume
 Gene ontology, a bioinformatics initiative
 Go, the pass condition in go/no go testing
 Graphite oxide, or, graphene oxide

Other uses
 Guarantee of origin (GO or GoO), an EU certification for electricity generation
 The Suns Gorilla, nicknamed "Go", mascot of the Phoenix Suns basketball team
 Grassroots Out, a 2016 organisation campaigning for British withdrawal from the European Union

See also
 Get Outdoors Georgia ("GO" Georgia), an initiative to promote healthy activities, Georgia, US
 Gomoku or Gobang, a strategy game traditionally played with go pieces
 
 Go go (disambiguation)
 No go (disambiguation)
 G0 (disambiguation)